Kurtis McLean (born November 2, 1980) is a Canadian professional ice hockey centre. He currently plays for Kiekko-Espoo in the Finnish Mestis.

Early life
McLean grew up in the small northern Ontario town of Kirkland Lake and played Midget AAA hockey for the New Liskeard Cubs. He also had a short stint with his hometown team, the Kirkland Lake Legion 87's. He attended Kirkland Lake's Collegiate and Vocational Institute.

Career 
Undrafted by the Ontario Hockey League after the 1996–97 season, McLean moved to the Trenton Sting of the Ontario Provincial Junior A Hockey League where he played three seasons. His exploits in Tier II Jr. hockey earned him a spot on the Norwich University (NCAA-III) roster the following year and became the first player in NCAA-III history to be named a first team all-American four years in a row.

After his four seasons at Norwich, McLean signed as an undrafted free-agent with the Pittsburgh Penguins in 2005. Called up to the Wilkes-Barre/Scranton Penguins from the Wheeling Nailers during the 2005–06 season, he played 32 games and finished second in total points with 54; third in goals scored with 22; and with a plus/minus of +14. He helped the Penguins win the Eastern Conference Championship and finished third on the team in playoff scoring with 19 points (4 goals and 15 assists).

On July 3, 2008, McLean signed with the New York Islanders. He was called up to the Islanders on January 19, 2009, and scored his first NHL goal, in his second NHL game, against Jean-Sebastien Giguere in a 2–1 win over the Anaheim Ducks on January 21, 2009.

On January 23, 2009, McLean was inducted into Hockey Heritage North. Town mayor Bill Enouy said of McLean, "They will never be able to take that off his resume. No matter what happens in the future he will always be a guy that played in the NHL".

On May 29, 2009, McLean signed a contract with Finnish club Lukko of the SM-liiga. He stayed for two seasons and captained the team during the 2010–11 season. McLean then moved to Switzerland's Nationalliga A and spent two seasons with the SCL Tigers where he led the team in points both seasons.

On May 22, 2013, Mclean signed for Lukko, signalling a return to Finland, but a month later he departed and instead signed a one-year contract with Metallurg Novokuznetsk of the Kontinental Hockey League. In the 2014–15 season, McLean continued to play in the KHL, splitting the year between Finnish club, Jokerit, and Croatian club, KHL Medveščak Zagreb.

McLean signed a one-year contract with the Vienna Capitals of the EBEL as a free agent on July 31, 2015. He left the Capitals during the season and signed a contract for the remainder of the 2015–16 season with EHC Wolfsburg of the German top flight Deutsche Eishockey Liga on February 16, 2016.

On August 30, 2016, McLean joined the Graz 99ers of the EBEL.

Career statistics

References

External links

1980 births
Living people
Bridgeport Sound Tigers players
HSC Csíkszereda players
Graz 99ers players
HC 07 Detva players
Ice hockey people from Ontario
Jokerit players
KHL Medveščak Zagreb players
Sportspeople from Kirkland Lake
Lukko players
Canadian expatriate ice hockey players in Finland
Metallurg Novokuznetsk players
New York Islanders players
Norwich Cadets men's ice hockey players
Richmond RiverDogs players
SCL Tigers players
TuTo players
Undrafted National Hockey League players
Vienna Capitals players
Wheeling Nailers players
Wilkes-Barre/Scranton Penguins players
Grizzlys Wolfsburg players
Canadian ice hockey centres
Canadian expatriate ice hockey players in Romania
Canadian expatriate ice hockey players in the United States
Canadian expatriate ice hockey players in Croatia
Canadian expatriate ice hockey players in Russia
Canadian expatriate ice hockey players in Switzerland
Canadian expatriate ice hockey players in Austria
Canadian expatriate ice hockey players in Germany
Canadian expatriate ice hockey players in Slovakia